Egg Hill Church is a historic church located at Potter Township, Centre County, Pennsylvania.  It was built in 1860, and is a one-story, banked building built of pine on a stone foundation.  It measures 35 feet wide and 42 feet long.  Regular services at the church were suspended in 1927.  The church is located at the southwest end of Egg Hill.

It was added to the National Register of Historic Places in 1979.

References

External links
The Pennsylvania Rambler Blog: Thursday, April 8, 2010, Egg Hill Church

Churches on the National Register of Historic Places in Pennsylvania
Churches completed in 1860
Churches in Centre County, Pennsylvania
National Register of Historic Places in Centre County, Pennsylvania